Nuclear power is a major power source in South Korea, providing 29% of the country's electricity.
The total electrical generation capacity of the nuclear power plants of South Korea is 20.5 GWe from 23 reactors, equivalent to 22% of South Korea's total electrical generation capacity.

In 2012 South Korea had plans for significant expansion of its nuclear power industry, and to increase nuclear's share of generation to 60% by 2035. 
Eleven more reactors were scheduled to come online in the period 2012 to 2021, adding 13.8 GWe in total. 
However, in 2013 the government submitted a reduced draft plan to parliament for nuclear output of up to 29% of generation capacity by 2035, following several scandals related to falsification of safety documentation. 
This plan still involved increasing 2035 nuclear capacity by 7 GWe, to 43 GWe.

However, responding to widespread public concerns after the Fukushima Daiichi nuclear disaster in Japan, the high earthquake risk in South Korea, and the nuclear scandals, the new government of President Moon Jae-in elected in 2017 decided to gradually phase out nuclear power. The three reactors currently under construction will be completed, but the government decided these will be the last built, and as the existing plants close at a 40 years end-of-life they will be replaced with other modes of generation. In 2020 it was planned that the number of nuclear reactors would be reduced to 17 by 2034, after a peak of 26 in 2024. However, nuclear policy was again reversed in 2023 by president Yoon Suk-yeol, resuming construction of nuclear reactors and expanding nuclear output to 34.6% share of South Korea electricity generation by 2036.

Nuclear power research in South Korea is very active with projects involving a variety of advanced reactors, including a small modular reactor, a liquid-metal fast/nuclear transmutation reactor, and a high-temperature hydrogen generation design. 
Fuel production and waste handling technologies have also been developed locally. South Korea is also a member of the ITER nuclear fusion research project.

South Korea is seeking to export its nuclear technology, with a goal of exporting 80 nuclear reactors by 2030. , South Korean companies have reached agreements to build a research reactor in Jordan, and four APR-1400 reactors in the United Arab Emirates.

Reactor overview
South Korea has only four active generating station sites, but each site houses four or more units, and three sites have more reactors planned.  Thus Korea's nuclear power production is slightly more centralized than most nuclear power nations. Housing multiple units at each site allows more efficient maintenance and lower costs, but reduces grid efficiencies. Four of the six Wolsong reactors are Canadian-designed CANDU pressurized heavy-water reactors (PHWR).

In 2013, in response to a petition from local fishermen, Korea Hydro and Nuclear Power (KHNP) renamed its Yonggwang plant as the Hanbit plant, and its Ulchin (or Uljin) plant in North Gyeongsang province was renamed as the Hanul plant.

In 2014, an agreement was signed to allow construction of two additional APR-1400 reactors at Hanul (as Shin Hanul-3 and -4; construction to start no earlier than 2017) and two units in Yeongdeok County (construction may start by 2022). The proposed site in Yeongdeok would be named Cheonji and would occupy land in the villages of Nomul-ri, Maejeong-ri, and Seok-ri in Yeongdeok-eup. Samcheok had been previously selected as a new site for reactors in 2012, but residents rejected a reactor in a 2015 referendum. The population of Yeongdeok declined from 113,000 in 1974 to 38,000 in 2016, with one-third of residents aged 65 or older; the site for a new nuclear power plant was sought as a way to ensure the continued survival of the county.

Moon Jae-in campaigned in 2017 for president following the impeachment of Park Geun-hye, vowing to not build any new reactors. At the time, five reactors were under construction, three of which were near completion (Shin Kori (SKN)-4; Shin Hanul-1 and -2) and two of which had just started (SKN-5 and -6). After Moon was sworn in, construction was suspended on SKN-5/6 in July 2017 and an independent panel was convened to evaluate continuing construction. After hearing from 471 citizens, the panel recommended that construction resume on SKN-5/6 in October 2017 by approximately a three-fifths majority.

Breakdown by reactor

History
In 1962, Korea's first research reactor achieved criticality. According to declassified U.S. government documents, the CIA discovered in 1975 that the Park dictatorship may have been pursuing a nuclear weapons program, but the Ford administration worked with France and Canada to convince Seoul to back down from a plan to acquire plutonium production capability - instead working out a technical agreement that helped South Korea develop a peaceful nuclear program.

Kori Nuclear Power Plant was the first plant in Korea to commence commercial operations in 1978. Since then, 19 more reactors have since been built using a mixture of CANDU (4 reactors) and PWR (16 reactors) technology.

According to the South Korean Ministry for a Knowledge Economy, the APR-1400's fuel costs are 23 percent lower than France-based Areva's EPR, known to be the most advanced nuclear power plant in the world. The government is also planning development of a new nuclear plant design, which will have 10 percent higher capacity and a safety rating better than the APR-1400. South Korea's nuclear power plants currently are operating at a rate of 93.4 percent, higher than the comparable U.S. operation rate of 89.9 percent, France's 76.1 percent, and Japan's 59.2 percent. South Korean nuclear plants have repeatedly recorded the lowest rate of emergency shutdowns in the world, a record due in large part to highly standardised design and operating procedures. The APR-1400 is designed, engineered, built and operated to meet the latest international regulatory requirements concerning safety, including those for aircraft impact resistance.

South Korea has also developed KSTAR (a.k.a. Korea Superconducting Tokamak Advanced Research), an advanced superconducting tokamak fusion research device.

In December 2010, Malaysia expressed interest in procuring South Korea's nuclear reactor technology. South Korea was also pursuing opportunities in Turkey and Indonesia, as well as in India and the People's Republic of China.

In October 2011, South Korea hosted of a series of events to raise public awareness about nuclear power. 
The events were coordinated by the Korea Nuclear Energy Promotion Agency (KONEPA) and included the participation of the French Atomic Forum (FAF); the International Atomic Energy Agency (IAEA); as well as public relations and information experts from countries that generate or plan to generate nuclear power.

In November 2012 it was discovered that over 5,000 small components used in five reactors at Yeonggwang Nuclear Power Plant had not been properly certified; eight suppliers had faked 60 warranties for the parts. Two reactors were shut down for component replacement, which was likely to cause power shortages in South Korea during the winter. Reuters reported this as South Korea's worst nuclear crisis, highlighting a lack of transparency on nuclear safety and the dual roles of South Korea's nuclear regulators on supervision and promotion. This incident followed the prosecution of five senior engineers for the coverup of a serious loss of power and cooling incident at Kori Nuclear Power Plant, which was subsequently graded at INES level 2.

In 2013, there was a scandal involving the use of counterfeit parts in nuclear plants and faked quality assurance certificates. In June 2013 Kori 2 and Shin Wolsong 1 were shut down, and Kori 1 and Shin Wolsong 2 ordered to remain offline, until safety-related control cabling with forged safety certificates is replaced. Control cabling in the first APR-1400s under construction had to be replaced delaying construction by up to a year. In October 2013 about 100 people were indicted for falsifying safety documents, including a former chief executive of Korea Hydro & Nuclear Power and a vice-president of Korea Electric Power Corporation.

Nuclear related organizations

The Korean Atomic Energy Research Institute (KAERI) is a government-funded research organization. The Korea Power Engineering Company, Inc.(KOPEC) engages in design, engineering, procurement and construction of nuclear power plants. The Korea Institute of Nuclear Safety (KINS) functions as the nuclear regulatory body of South Korea. The Korea Atomic Intelligence Agency of Children (KAIAC) is dedicated to more research and development of nuclear power plants. It is also an educational organization that teaches children about power plants and nuclear energy.

Anti-nuclear movement

The anti-nuclear movement in South Korea consists of environmental groups, religious groups, unions, co-ops, and professional associations. In December 2011, protesters demonstrated in Seoul and other areas after the government announced it had picked sites for two new nuclear plants.

The East Coast Solidarity for Anti-Nuke Group was formed in January 2012. 
The group is against nuclear power and against plans for new nuclear power plants in Samcheok and Yeongdeok, and for the closure of existing nuclear reactors in Wolseong and Gori.

In January 2012, 22 South Korean women's groups made a plea for a nuclear free future. The women said they feel an enormous sense of crisis after the Fukushima nuclear disaster in March 2011, which demonstrated the destructive power of radiation in the loss of human lives, environmental pollution, and contamination of food.

Choi Yul, president of the Korea Green Foundation, has said "The March 11 disaster has proven that nuclear power plants are not safe". Choi said antinuclear sentiment is growing in South Korea amid the Fukushima crisis, and there is a chance to reverse the country's nuclear policy in 2012 because South Korea is facing a presidential election. In 2014, a professor of atomic engineering at Seoul National University stated that "The public has totally lost trust in nuclear power".

Nuclear research
Research reactors:
 Aerojet General Nucleonics Model 201 Research Reactor
 HANARO, MAPLE class reactor
 TRIGA General Atomics Mark II/III (TRIGA-Mark II/III) Research Reactor (Decommissioned)
 KSTAR Reactor

See also 

 Energy in South Korea
 One Less Nuclear Power Plant, energy conservation policy of Seoul

Bibliography 

 Nuclear Transparency in the Asia Pacific: Nuclear reactor maps: Korea
 To Authorize the President to Extend the Term of the Agreement for Cooperation Between the Government of the United States of America and the Government of the Republic of Korea Concerning Civil Uses of Nuclear Energy for a Period Not to Exceed March 19, 2016: Report (To Accompany H.R. 2449) (Including Cost Estimate of the Congressional Budget Office) United States House Committee on Foreign Affairs

References